Tie Feiyan (born 1992) is a politician in the People's Republic of China.

Tie was a member of the 12th National People's Congress.

References

Living people
1992 births
Delegates to the 12th National People's Congress
21st-century Chinese women politicians
21st-century Chinese politicians
People's Republic of China politicians from Yunnan
Female members of the National People's Congress
Delegates to the National People's Congress from Yunnan
Hui people
People from Zhaotong